Rashid Khan (born 21 February 2001) is a Nepalese cricketer. In November 2019, he was named in Nepal's squad for the men's cricket tournament at the 2019 South Asian Games. He made his Twenty20 International (T20I) debut for Nepal, against Bhutan, on 5 December 2019. The Nepal team won the bronze medal, after they beat the Maldives by five wickets in the third-place playoff match. In September 2020, he was one of eighteen cricketers to be awarded with a central contract by the Cricket Association of Nepal.

References

External links
 

2001 births
Living people
Nepalese cricketers
Nepal Twenty20 International cricketers
South Asian Games bronze medalists for Nepal
South Asian Games medalists in cricket
People from Birgunj